Mohammad Nizam (2 October 1951 – 21 September 2015) was a lyricist in the Odia movie industry. Nizam's songs appeared in over 160 movies. He was a screenwriter for over 50 movies and television shows, as well as providing scripts for over 70 stage shows.

Early life 
Nizam was born on 2 October 1951 in Sutaahat, Cuttack; his father was Aasad Naazim. He started as a football player for Odisha and played for ten years. He later received a job in Postal Accounts for his talent in sports.

Musical career 
Nizam began his career writing songs for the Odia movie Anutap, which included the popular song "Nida bharaa raati madhujharaa janha". Following Anutap, he gained further success with his work for the movies Samar Salim Saaiman, Maanini, and Phula Chandana. Nizam received the Best Singer Award at the State Movie Awards for the movies Rajnigandha (1989), Jeebana Sathee (1997) and Lakshmi Baramma. His first song, "Saharara bati galaani libhi", was telecast on Yuvabaanee programmes from Akashvaani Katak in 1968 and 1969. Nizam used to write devotional songs for Lord Jagannath, otherwise known as "Sala Beg", said film director Sanjay Nayak in 1969.

Death 
Nizam died on 21 September 2015 while being treated at Apollo hospital. His family claimed that Nazim's body was held for hours after his death to inflate the hospital bill. He was cremated at Dargha Bazar, Cuttack.

List of movies with his songs

Awards 

 Best singer (State Movie Award)
 Sikandar Award
 Yadumani Das Memorial Talent Award
 National Art Talent Award
 Akshyaya Mohanty Foundation Award

References

External links 
 
 75-milestomes-in-odia-film

1951 births
2015 deaths
Indian lyricists
Ollywood
People from Odisha